Desperado Square is a 2001 Israeli film.

Cast
Yosef Shiloach, 
Yona Elian, 
Mohammed Bakri, 
Uri Gavriel, 
Nir Levy, 
Ayelet Zurer

Festivals and awards
Montpellier Film Festival, France 2001 - Antigone d'Or
Israeli Academy Awards 2001 - Best Director, Best Supporting Actor, Best Art Direction, Best Costume, Best Original Music
Valencia Film Festival, Spain 2002 - Best Script

References

External links
Desperado Square Rotten Tomatoes
Desperado Square Israeli Films

Israeli comedy-drama films
Films set in Tel Aviv
Films set in a movie theatre